Prelude and Fugue in B minor, BWV 893, is a keyboard composition by Johann Sebastian Bach. It is the 24th and final prelude and fugue in the second book of The Well-Tempered Clavier, a series of 48 preludes and fugues by the composer. It was composed in 1738.

Prelude 
The prelude is in the key of B minor and in the time signature of cut time (2/2). It is in 2 voices and has 66 measures. There is rarely any ornamentation in this piece.

Fugue 
The fugue is also in B minor and is in 3/8. It is in 3 voices and has 100 measures. It ends with a Picardy third.

References

External links

, Malcolm Hamilton, 1965

The Well-Tempered Clavier
Compositions in B minor